Lake Õisu is a lake in Mulgi Parish, Viljandi County, in southern Estonia.

See also
List of lakes of Estonia

Oisu
Mulgi Parish
Oisu